American Pie is the second studio album by American singer-songwriter Don McLean, released by United Artists Records on 24 October 1971. The folk rock album reached number one on the Billboard 200, containing the chart-topping singles "American Pie" and "Vincent". Recorded in May and June 1971 at The Record Plant in New York City, the LP is dedicated to Buddy Holly, and was reissued in 1980 minus the track "Sister Fatima". The album was released to much acclaim, later being included in the book 1001 Albums You Must Hear Before You Die.

At the Australian 1972 King of Pop Awards the album won Most Popular Overseas L.P.

Background
American Pie is McLean’s second album; his first, Tapestry, having been released to only moderate commercial success and acclaim in 1970. McLean was a protégé of Pete Seeger, having played with him in the 1960s. The album American Pie was intended as a unified work, as McLean has said that he was influenced by the Beatles' Sgt Pepper album and envisioned American Pie to be a similar album. Believing that an artist's work should stand by itself, McLean generally did not offer explanations for his work's themes or meaning, though he did describe the title song as involving "a sense of loss". McLean dedicated the album to Buddy Holly, one of his childhood icons, and it was released in 1971. It has a melancholy feel and rather sparse arrangements. At the time of the writing McLean’s first marriage was failing and the optimism and hopefulness of the 1960s was giving way to the nihilism and hedonism of the 1970s.

Production
The album was recorded in Studio A at The Record Plant on West 44th street in New York City. The producer, Ed Freeman, decided to use accomplished musicians who were not "studio musicians who could act like a metronome" because he wanted to capture the feel of a "band that was really cooking," so he rented a rehearsal studio and they rehearsed the title song for two weeks before they recorded it. Because McLean rarely phrased his singing the same way twice there were as many as 24 takes for some of the voice parts, but the rhythm tracks are mostly one take.

The original United Artists Records inner sleeve featured a free verse poem  written by McLean about William Boyd, also known as Hopalong Cassidy, along with a picture of Boyd in full Hopalong regalia. This sleeve was removed within a year of the album's release. The words to this poem appear on a plaque at the hospital where Boyd died. The Boyd poem and picture tribute do appear on a special remastered 2003 CD.

The title track contains references to the death of Buddy Holly (McLean being a 13-year-old paper-boy at the time). The phrase "The Day the Music Died" was used by McLean on this song, and has now become an unofficial name for the tragedy.

On the original release, the title of the song "Sister Fatima" is misspelled "Sister Faima" 

The final track, "Babylon", is a close paraphrase of the 1st Verse of the 137th Psalm. It is based on the canon "By the Waters of Babylon" by Philip Hayes, originally published in 1786.

Back-up singers 
The final chorus of "American Pie" features multi-tracked overdubs, credited in the sleeve notes to the "West Forty Fourth Street Rhythm and Noise Choir". Although the individual choristers have never been publicly named, the album's producer, Ed Freeman, has claimed that the choir included Pete Seeger, James Taylor, Livingston Taylor and Carly Simon.

Release and reception

The album reached number 1 within two weeks of release and was certified gold within six months, spending almost a year on the Billboard album charts.  Its appeal cut across genres in what was becoming a fragmented music scene.

Reissue
The album was reissued in 1980 without the song "Sister Fatima", and again on June 27, 2003 with the track restored, along with the addition of two bonus tracks. Also the first Spanish issue delivered by Hispavox was released without "Sister Fatima".

Legacy 
In February 2003 George Michael recorded a cover of "The Grave" as a protest against the imminent Iraq War. A cover of the song "Babylon" was included in a scene in the television series Mad Men. It is based on the canon "By the Waters of Babylon" by Philip Hayes.

Track listing
All songs written by Don McLean except where noted.

Personnel
 Don McLean – vocals, acoustic guitar, banjo
 Warren Bernhardt – piano ("Crossroads")
 Ray Colcord – electric piano
 Tom Flye – drums ("The Grave"), engineering
 Ed Freeman – string arrangements
 Paul Griffin – piano ("American Pie")
 Lee Hays – arranger
 Mike Mainieri – marimba, vibraphone
 Roy Markowitz – drums, percussion
 Gene Orloff – concertmaster
 Bob Rothstein – bass, vocals
 David Spinozza – electric guitar ("American Pie")
 West Forty Fourth Street Rhythm and Noise Choir – chorus

Charts

Certifications and sales

References

Don McLean albums
1971 albums
Albums recorded at Record Plant (New York City)
United Artists Records albums
Liberty Records albums
Capitol Records albums